Dance Dance Revolution Solo is a short-lived series of games spun off of the main Dance Dance Revolution series. It consists of three arcade releases in Japan. The game mode was also adapted for use in a children's arcade version and two console releases (as a game mode).

Gameplay
Gameplay in the Solo series is nearly identical to that of the main Dance Dance Revolution series, but with a few differences to optimize the game for single-player mode.  In addition to the four-panel mode offered in the main series, Solo adds a three-panel mode in its Bass Mix and 2000 releases, as well as a six-panel mode in all of its releases.  Both modes add two new panels: up-left and up-right.  The three-panel mode adds the down arrow to these, while the six-panel mode combines both the four traditional panels and the two new panels.

Games

Main series

Dance Dance Revolution Solo Bass Mix 
 is the first game in the series. It was released as an arcade game by Konami on August 19, 1999 in Japan. The game premiered 16 songs to the series and takes its name, as well as most of its soundtrack, from the Dancemania BASS albums. This is the first game that features a live-action intro.

Dance Dance Revolution Solo 2000 
 the second game in the series. It was released as an arcade game by Konami on December 16, 1999 in Japan. DDR Solo 2000 premiered 20 songs to the series and also featured all 16 songs from Bass Mix, for a total of 36 songs.

Dance Dance Revolution Solo 4thMix 
This game and Dance Dance Revolution Solo 4thMix Plus were released concurrently with 4thMix and 4thMix Plus respectively, designed for use with Solo cabinets. The changes in the actual game engine are few, but significant. The 4 and 6-panel modes are offered instead of the usual options, and the chubby arrows of the Solo series also appear. Multi-player Mode from the Solo series is not present in either game.

Derivatives 
While not Solo releases per se, these games offer a one-player mode inspired by Solo.
 Dance Dance Revolution Extra Mix for the PlayStation in Japan featured a total of 50 songs: 33 of the 36 songs from Solo 2000, plus 11 songs that premiered in 4thMix Plus, four previews from 5thMix and two songs that later premiered in DDRMAX 6thMix. Of these, only the Solo 2000 and 4thMix Plus songs include Solo steps, though Edit Mode allows players to create custom Solo steps for any of the 50 songs.
 Dance Dance Revolution Konamix for the PlayStation is the first release in North America to feature a Solo mode.
Released in December 2000 by Konami for the Japanese arcade rooms, DDR Kids is limited in comparison to the main series. Only one player can play at a time, the steps are very simplistic and it's easier to score a passing grade. The arcade machine is smaller than a typical DDR machine, designed for smaller players. The song selection is also limited with only a couple of tracks from the main series. The rest are mostly exclusive to this release and feature theme songs to children's shows that have aired in Japan.
 Dancing Karaoke DKara was released on January 16, 2001. It combined the gameplay of Dance Dance Revolution with karaoke style singing. Konami had previously released two titles with similar gameplay in the past as very rare arcade machines. The song selection was primarily download driven and features a unique set of music that has not been repeated in any other DDR game. The downloadable songs were sold for ¥150 a song and released in packs of varying size a week or so apart from each other. As of August 9, 2001 the total number of songs available for DKara including the original game and downloadable content was 80, however an undetermined number of songs have been released since then. A newer release, Karaoke Revolution Party, features similar gameplay.

Music

Songs
All songs from Solo BASSMIX can also be played in Solo 2000.

Dance Dance Revolution Kids
 アンパンマンマーチ (♪)
 ウルトラマンガイア (♪)
 おどるポンポコリン (♪♪)
 ターゲット～赤い衝撃～(♪♪♪)
 ダメダメのうた (♪♪)
 プラチナ (♪♪♪♪)
 めざせ! ポケモンマスター (♪)
 SHAKE (♪♪♪♪)
 全部抱きしめて (♪♪)
 LOVEマシーン (♪♪♪)
 WAになっておどろう (♪♪)

Dancing Karaoke DKara

Courses

Soundtrack
A combined soundtrack for both DDR Solo mixes was released by Toshiba-EMI under their Dancemania dance music brand. It contains 35 tracks from the game and all 9 megamixes.

Controversy
In 2002, a bowling alley in San Diego, California removed a Solo 2000 machine after Jennifer Stoefen and several members of a local group, known as Youth Advocacy Coalition (YAC), complained that the background movies of selected songs contained images that could promote substance abuse, such as a scantily clad nurse and pills in "I'm Alive" and alcoholic drinks appearing in "Club Tropicana". The news received coverage on FOX 6 News and NBC 7/39 News.

Other arcades also opted to replace their Solo 2000 machines with DDRMAX Dance Dance Revolution 6thMix or its sequel, which do not feature the nurse theme and alcohol references, but do include profanity in a few songs. Konami responded by warning arcades that such machines are illegally imported. Using the DDR Freak fan site, the YAC located other Solo 2000 machines and considered contacting the operators, asking for the games to be removed or replaced. DDR Freak published a statement criticizing the news reports for their lack of journalistic objectivity and denying allegations of Dance Dance Revolution promoting substance abuse. The community pointed out that Solo 2000 is portraying a medical theme, and that fighting and shooting arcade games such as Street Fighter and The House of the Dead have moderate to strong life-like violence.

See also
 Dance Dance Revolution
 Oha Suta Dance Dance Revolution, also designed for kids

References

Konami franchises
Dance Dance Revolution games
Video game controversies